Wayne Township is one of thirteen townships in Butler County, Ohio, United States. The township is located in the north-central part of the county, between Trenton and Oxford. It had a total population of 4,375 at the 2020 census.

History
Wayne was the sixth township of the county, erected from St. Clair Township by the Butler County Commissioners on December 2, 1805.

Name
Named for General Anthony Wayne, it is one of twenty Wayne Townships in Ohio.

Geography
Located in the northern part of the county, it borders the following townships:
Gratis Township, Preble County - north
Madison Township - east
St. Clair Township - south
Hanover Township - southwest corner
Milford Township - west
Somers Township, Preble County - northwest corner

Two villages are located in Wayne Township: Jacksonburg in the northeast, and part of Seven Mile, in the south.

Government
The township is governed by a three-member board of trustees, who are elected in November of odd-numbered years to a four-year term beginning on the following January 1.  Two are elected in the year after the presidential election and one is elected in the year before it.  There is also an elected township fiscal officer, who serves a four-year term beginning on April 1 of the year after the election, which is held in November of the year before the presidential election.  Vacancies in the fiscal officership or on the board of trustees are filled by the remaining trustees.

Public services
The township is in the Edgewood Local School District.

The township is in the Trenton and Seven Mile telephone exchanges.

Major roads are U.S. Route 127 (the principal road between Hamilton and Eaton), and State Routes 73 (the principal road between Oxford and Middletown), 122, 503, and 744.

References

Bert S. Barlow, W.H. Todhunter, Stephen D. Cone, Joseph J. Pater, and Frederick Schneider, eds.  Centennial History of Butler County, Ohio.  Hamilton, Ohio:  B.F. Bowen, 1905.
Jim Blount.  The 1900s:  100 Years In the History of Butler County, Ohio.  Hamilton, Ohio:  Past Present Press, 2000.
Butler County Engineer's Office.  Butler County Official Transportation Map, 2003.  Fairfield Township, Butler County, Ohio:  The Office, 2003.
A History and Biographical Cyclopaedia of Butler County, Ohio with Illustrations and Sketches of Its Representative Men and Pioneers.  Cincinnati, Ohio:  Western Biographical Publishing Company, 1882. 
Ohio. Secretary of State.  The Ohio municipal and township roster, 2002-2003.  Columbus, Ohio:  The Secretary, 2003.

External links
Township website
County website

Townships in Butler County, Ohio
Townships in Ohio
1805 establishments in Ohio
Populated places established in 1805